Treaty of Radnot was a treaty signed during the Second Northern War in Radnot in Transylvania (now Iernut in Romania) on 6 December 1656. The treaty divided the Polish–Lithuanian Commonwealth between the signing parties.

According to the treaty:
 Charles X Gustav of Sweden was to receive Royal Prussia, Kujawy, northern Masovia, Samogitia, Courland and Inflanty.
 Bogusław Radziwiłł was to receive the Nowogródek Voivodeship.
 Frederick William, Elector of Brandenburg was to receive Greater Poland.
 Bohdan Khmelnytsky was to receive south-eastern parts of the Kingdom of Poland (territories between Batoh and Novhorod-Siverskyi).
 George II Rákóczi was to receive southern Polish territories, mostly Lesser Poland (including Kraków).

One of the main results of the treaty was that George II Rákóczi invaded the Commonwealth in January 1657. The changing geopolitical situation prevented the treaty from ever being fully implemented as the Commonwealth recovered and repulsed the invaders. The treaty is seen as a precursor to the 18th-century partitions of the Polish–Lithuanian Commonwealth.

References
Robert I. Frost, After the Deluge: Poland-Lithuania and the Second Northern War, 1655-1660, Cambridge University Press, 2004, Google Print, p. 85
William Young, International Politics and Warfare in the Age of Louis XIV and Peter the Great: A Guide to the Historical Literature, iUniverse, 2004, Google Print, p.421

Second Northern War
1656 treaties
Treaties of the Swedish Empire
Radnot
1656 in Europe
1656 in Sweden